Ernst Friedrich Hieronymus Ebeling (29 October 1804, Hanover12 September 1851, Hanover) was a German architect and building official.

Life and work
He began studying architecture under the Court Building Officer  In 1823 he continued his studies with Friedrich Weinbrenner in Karlsruhe. Following Weinbrenner's death in 1826, he spent two years on a study trip to Rome.

From 1829, he worked as an architect for military buildings. He became the first teacher of architecture at the new arts and crafts school in 1831. Following an outbreak of cholera on the Russian border, he and the Royal Surgeon,  visited the quarantine zone there and designed similar facilities in Damnatz.

He returned to Russia in 1832, visiting Saint Petersburg, where he was involved in erecting the Alexander Column. He later visited England and, in 1843, made another trip to Italy. During this time, he designed several projects with the aim of introducing architectural styles from those countries to Hanover. He built his own home, in a similar style, in 1850. He was a co-founder of the

References

Further reading
 
 "Ebeling, Ernst". In: Rudolf Vierhaus (Ed.): Deutsche Biographische Enzyklopädie, Vol.2: Brann–Einslin. De Gruyter/K. G. Saur, 2005, pg.665.
 Friedrich Noack: "Ebeling, Ernst". In: Ulrich Thieme (Ed.): Allgemeines Lexikon der Bildenden Künstler von der Antike bis zur Gegenwart, Vol.10: Dubolon–Erlwein. E. A. Seemann, Leipzig 1914, pg.292 (Online)
 
 Helmut Knocke: "Ebeling, Ernst", In: Klaus Mlynek, Waldemar R. Röhrbein (Eds.), Stadtlexikon Hannover. Von den Anfängen bis in die Gegenwart. Schlütersche, Hannover 2009, pg.143.

External links

 Reinhard Glaß: Ebeling, Ernst @ Architekten und Künstler mit direktem Bezug zu Conrad Wilhelm Hase (1818–1902)

1804 births
1851 deaths
19th-century German architects
Architects from Hanover